70 Aquarii is a variable star located 425 light years away from the Sun in the equatorial constellation of Aquarius. It has the variable star designation FM Aquarii; 70 Aquarii is the Flamsteed designation. It is near the lower limit of visibility to the naked eye, appearing as a dim, yellow-white hued star with a baseline apparent visual magnitude of 6.19. This star is moving closer to the Earth with a heliocentric radial velocity of –5.8 km/s.

The star has a high rate of spin, showing a projected rotational velocity of 110 km/s. It has four times the Sun's radius and is radiating 45 times the luminosity of the Sun from its photosphere at an effective temperature of around 7,314 K.

References

External links
 Image 70 Aquarii

F-type main-sequence stars
Delta Scuti variables
Aquarius (constellation)
Durchmusterung objects
Aquarii, 070
215874
112615
8676
Aquarii, FM